KTFF 1. Lig (English: CTFA First League), formerly known as İkinci Lig (literally Second League) is the second-highest division of association football in Northern Cyprus. It is administered by the Cyprus Turkish Football Federation and has 16 clubs.

At the end of the season, the top two clubs are promoted to the KTFF Süper Lig, and the next top four clubs play play-off matches to determine the third team to be promoted. The bottom two are relegated to the BTM 1. Lig, and the next four clubs from the bottom play play-out matches to determine the third team to be relegated.

Current teams

Champions

1955–56 – Yenicami (Nicosia)
1956–57 – Yeşilada (Nicosia)
1957–58 – Türk Ocağı (Limassol)
1958–59 – Küçük Kaymaklı (Nicosia)
1959–60 – Sönmezspor (Nicosia)
1960–61 – Baf Ülkü Yurdu (Paphos)
1961–62 – Lefke (Nicosia)
1962–63 – Gönyeli (Nicosia)
1963–64 – Abandoned due to Cypriot intercommunal violence
1964–65 – Not played due to Cypriot intercommunal violence
1965–66 – Not played due to Cypriot intercommunal violence
1966–67 – Not played due to Cypriot intercommunal violence
1967–68 – Not played due to Cypriot intercommunal violence
1968–69 – Gönyeli (Nicosia)
1969–70 – Gençlik Gücü (Nicosia)
1970–71 – Yalova (Nicosia)
1971–72 – Lefke (Nicosia)
1972–73 – Yalova (Nicosia)
1973–74 – Beyarmudu (Larnaca)
1974–75 – Not played due to Turkish intervention in Cyprus
1975–76 – Küçük Kaymaklı (Nicosia)
1976–77 – Yalova (Nicosia)
1977–78 – Beyarmudu (Nicosia)
1978–79 – Dumlupınar (Famagusta)
1979–80 – Yalova (Nicosia)
1980–81 – Gençler Birliği (Famagusta)
1981–82 – Ortaköy (Nicosia)
1982–83 – Yenicami (Nicosia)
1983–84 – Binatlı (Nicosia)
1984–85 – Alsancak Yeşilova (Kyrenia)
1985–86 – Doğan Türk Birliği (Kyrenia)
1986–87 – Yalova (Nicosia)
1987–88 – Vadili (Famagusta)
1988–89 – Yenicami (Nicosia)
1989–90 – Lefke (Nicosia)
1990–91 – Gençlik Gücü (Nicosia)
1991–92 – Gençler Birliği (Famagusta)
1992–93 – Akıncılar (Nicosia)
1993–94 – Mağusa Türk Gücü (Famagusta)
1994–95 – Lefke (Nicosia)
1995–96 – Binatlı (Nicosia)
1996–97 – Türk Ocağı (Kyrenia)
1997–98 – Doğan Türk Birliği (Kyrenia)
1998–99 – Baf Ülkü Yurdu (Morphou)
1999–00 – Gençlik Gücü (Nicosia)
2000–01 – Baf Ülkü Yurdu (Morphou)
2001–02 – Lapta (Kyrenia)
2002–03 – Gençler Birliği (Trikomo)
2003–04 – Lapta (Kyrenia)
2004–05 – Girne Halk Evi (Kyrenia)
2005–06 – Bostancı Bağcıl (Morphou)
2006–07 – Ozanköy (Kyrenia)
2007–08 – Binatlı (Morphou)
2008–09 – Doğan Türk Birliği (Kyrenia)
2009–10 – Düzkaya (Kyrenia)
2010–11 - Yenicami (Nicosia)
2011–12 - Gençlik Gücü (Nicosia)
2012–13 - Yeni Boğaziçi (Famagusta)
2013–14 – Türk Ocağı (Kyrenia)
2014–15 – Türk Ocağı (Kyrenia)
2015–16 – Dumlupınar (Famagusta)
2016–17 – Alsancak Yeşilova (Kyrenia)
2017–18 – Gönyeli (Nicosia)

Promotion and relegation

External links
2007-08 results RSSSF

Football competitions in Northern Cyprus
Sports leagues established in 1955
1955 establishments in Cyprus